Samuel Brown Taylor (February 26, 1898 – April 1, 1966) was an American educator, Negro league baseball player, and college football coach. He served as the head football coach at Virginia State College for Negroes—now known as Virginia State University—in 1925, Clark College—now known as Clark Atlanta University—from 1925 to 1929, Prairie View State Normal & Industrial College—now known as Prairie View A&M University—from 1931 to 1943, Virginia Union University from 1945 to 1948, Bluefield State College—now known as Bluefield State University—from 1948 to 1958, and Kentucky State College—now known as Kentucky State University—from 1959 to 1962.

Playing career
A native of Doswell, Virginia, Taylor attended Northwestern University. He played Negro league baseball for the Dayton Marcos in 1926.

Educator
In 1943, Taylor was named the "Supervisor of Negro Education" for the state of Kentucky.  He was one of the primary educators in the state of Kentucky responsible for de-segregation of public schools after the Brown v. Board of Education ruling in 1954.

Coaching career

Virginia State
Taylor began his coaching career at the Virginia Normal School and Industrial Institute (now known as Virginia State University) as its first men's basketball coach in 1924–25.

Clark
In September 1925, Taylor and his new bride, Lullene Perrin, moved to Clark College–now known as Clark Atlanta University–in Atlanta, where Taylor coached football until 1930.

Prairie View
Taylor established an athletics program that included track and football. His track team was second to none between 1931 and 1942. He coach such athletes as "Blue" Stanley, Lewis "Jack Rabbit" Smith, Johnny Marion, and Veda "Skeets" Metlock Johnson. Johnny Marion and Lewis Smith ran against Jesse Owens in the Olympic Trials of 1936.

Taylor was the fourth head football coach at Prairie View A&M University in Prairie View, Texas, serving for 13 seasons, from 1931 until 1943. He was inducted into the Prairie View Athletic Hall of Fame in June 1987.

Virginia Union
Taylor took over the reins as head football coach and track coach at Virginia Union University in 1945 after the war. Once again, Lewis "Jack Rabbit" Smith teamed up with Taylor and ran under the maroon and steel colors of Virginia Union.

In 1948, the Virginia Union football team defeated Jake Gaither's Florida A&M Rattlers in the Orange Blossom Classic, 39–18.

Bluefield State
In the summer of 1949, Taylor was hired as the head football coach at Bluefield State College—known know as Bluefield State University—in Bluefield, West Virginia. He coached at Bluefield State until late spring 1959.

Kentucky State
Taylor was the 13th head football coach at Kentucky State University in Frankfort, Kentucky, serving for four seasons, from 1959 to 1962, and compiling a record of 15–20–1. Hip replacement surgery sidelined Taylor as the football coach, but he continued to coach track. In 1965, Taylor had the fastest quarter mile runner in the country.

Death and honors
After a lengthy illness, Taylor died in Lexington, Kentucky in 1966 at age 68. He was inducted into the K-Club Athletic Hall of Fame October 2009.

Head coaching record

Football

Notes

References

External links
 and Seamheads
 

1898 births
1966 deaths
African-American basketball coaches
African-American coaches of American football
African-American players of American football
American football ends
Baseball first basemen
Baseball players from Richmond, Virginia
Basketball coaches from Virginia
Bluefield State Big Blues athletic directors
Bluefield State Big Blues football coaches
Clark Atlanta Panthers football coaches
College track and field coaches in the United States
Dayton Marcos players
Kentucky State Thorobreds football coaches
Northwestern Wildcats football players
People from Hanover County, Virginia
Players of American football from Virginia
Prairie View A&M Panthers football coaches
Virginia Union Panthers football coaches
Virginia State Trojans football coaches
Virginia State Trojans men's basketball coaches
20th-century African-American sportspeople